Anthony Remeral Gill (born October 17, 1992) is an American basketball player for the Washington Wizards of the National Basketball Association (NBA). Gill played college basketball for the South Carolina Gamecocks and the Virginia Cavaliers.

College career

Recruiting

South Carolina

Gill played in all 31 of South Carolina's games and started in 26 of them. Following the firing of head coach Darrin Horn, Gill was given permission to transfer from South Carolina.

Virginia
Gill received interest from Ohio State and North Carolina but ultimately elected to transfer to the University of Virginia. After sitting out his redshirt season, Gill played an important role off the bench for the Cavaliers during a season where the team won both the ACC regular season and tournament titles. He injured his ankle during Virginia's loss to Michigan State in the Sweet Sixteen round of the 2014 NCAA tournament. During his junior season, Gill led the Cavaliers in rebounding with 6.5 rebounds per game and ranked third in scoring with 11.6 points per game. Following the season, he was named third-team All-ACC and voted onto the coaches' All-ACC Defensive Team.

Professional career

Yeşilgiresun Belediye (2016–2017)
After going undrafted in the 2016 NBA draft, Gill signed with MHP Riesen Ludwigsburg in Germany. However, he left the team prior to the season's start after failing a medical exam on August 23, 2016. Gill then signed with Yeşilgiresun Belediye of the Basketbol Süper Ligi.

Khimki (2017–2020)
On June 24, 2017 Gill signed a contract to play for the Charlotte Hornets during the 2017 NBA Summer League. He later signed with Khimki of the VTB United League. On August 3, 2020, Gill parted ways with the team.

Washington Wizards (2020–present)
In December 1, 2020, Gill signed a two-year deal with the Washington Wizards.

On July 1, 2022, Gill signed another two-year deal with the Wizards.

Career statistics

NBA

Regular season

|-
| style="text-align:left;"| 
| style="text-align:left;"| Washington
| 26 || 4 || 8.4 || .500 || .292 || .813 || 2.0 || .4 || .4 || .2 || 3.1
|-
| style="text-align:left;"| 
| style="text-align:left;"| Washington
| 44 || 0 || 10.5 || .569 || .538 || .808 || 1.9 || .6 || .1 || .3 || 4.1
|- class="sortbottom"
| align="center" colspan="2"| Career
| 70 || 4 || 9.7 || .544 || .420 || .809 || 1.9 || .5 || .2 || .2 || 3.7

Playoffs

|-
| style="text-align:left;"| 2021
| style="text-align:left;"| Washington
| 4 || 0 || 8.3 || .000 || .000 || – || 1.0 || .0 || .0 || .0 || .0
|- class="sortbottom"
| align="center" colspan="2"| Career
| 4 || 0 || 8.3 || .000 || .000 || – || 1.0 || .0 || .0 || .0 || .0

EuroLeague

|-
| style="text-align:left;"| 2017–18
| style="text-align:left;" rowspan=2| Khimki
| 32 || 31 || 25.9 || .588 || .478 || .743 || 4.5 || 1.0 || .5 || .6 || 11.8 || 13.1
|-
| style="text-align:left;"| 2018–19
| 13 || 11 || 26.6 || .546 || .222 || .767 || 3.5 || 1.6 || .8 || .6 || 11.5 || 12.1
|- class="sortbottom"
| align="center" colspan="2"| Career
| 45 || 42 || 26.1 || .574 || .390 || .755 || 4.2 || 1.2 || .6 || .6 || 11.7 || 12.8

College statistics

|-
| style="text-align:left;"| 2011–12
| style="text-align:left;"| South Carolina
| 31 || 26 || 25.3 || .453 || .393 || .646 || 4.7 || 1.1 || .5 || .3 || 7.6
|-
| style="text-align:left;"| 2013–14
| style="text-align:left;"| Virginia
| 34 || 6 || 19.8 || .587 || – || .627 || 4.0 || .4 || .3 || .5 || 8.6
|-
| style="text-align:left;"| 2014–15
| style="text-align:left;"| Virginia
| 34 || 30 || 25.3 || .582 || .000 || .677 || 6.5 || .9 || .9 || .5 || 11.6
|-
| style="text-align:left;"| 2015–16
| style="text-align:left;"| Virginia
| 37 || 37 || 28.0 || .580 || 1.000 || .746 || 6.1 || .8 || .6 || .6 || 13.8
|- class="sortbottom"
| align="center" colspan="2" | Career
| 139 || 99 || 24.6 || .556 || .419 || .680 || 5.3 || .8 || .6 || .5 || 10.5

Personal life
Gill was born October 17, 1992 to Sandi Summers and Anthony Gill. He has a brother named Daxton and two sisters named Nichole and Kaytlyn. Gill was born with nerve damage, resulting in the temporary paralysis of the right side of his face.

Off the court, Gill has a reputation of being a prankster. He often makes up stories during interviews, such as owning a two-headed Siamese cat and being a magician in his free time. Anthony married his high school sweetheart, Jenna Jamil, on April 8, 2016. Teammates Malcolm Brogdon, Devon Hall, London Perrantes and Darius Thompson were groomsmen. Gill majored in anthropology.

References

External links
 Virginia Cavaliers bio
 EuroLeague profile
 

1992 births
Living people
American expatriate basketball people in Russia
American expatriate basketball people in Turkey
American men's basketball players
Basketball players from Charlotte, North Carolina
BC Khimki players
Charlotte Christian School alumni
Power forwards (basketball)
South Carolina Gamecocks men's basketball players
Sportspeople from High Point, North Carolina
Undrafted National Basketball Association players
Virginia Cavaliers men's basketball players
Washington Wizards players
Yeşilgiresun Belediye players